Niv Horesh (Hebrew: ניב חורש, Chinese: 荷尼夫; born 1971) is a researcher at Western Sydney University, Australia. He was also Visiting Professor in China Studies at the School of Government and International Affairs at Durham University, United Kingdom. Besides his academic work, he is also a frequent commentator on current affairs in newspapers such as the South China Morning Post and Haaretz.

Published works 

His first book, Shanghai's Bund and Beyond (Yale UP, 2008), is the first comparative study of foreign banking in prewar China. The book surveys the impact of British overseas bank notes on China's economy before the outbreak of the Second Sino-Japanese War in 1937. Focusing on the two leading British banks in the region (Hongkong and Shanghai Banking Corporation and Chartered Bank of India, Australia and China), it assesses the favourable and unfavourable effects of the British presence in China, with particular emphasis on Shanghai, and traces instructive links between the changing political climate and banknote circulation volumes. Drawing on recently declassified archival materials, Niv Horesh revises previous assumptions about China's prewar economy, including the extent of foreign banknote circulation and the economic significance of the May Thirtieth Movement of 1925.

Horesh's second book Chinese Money in Global Context (Stanford UP 2013, Economics and Finance Series) makes for a China-centered examination of the evolution of money and finance around the world since the birth of coinage in Lydia (in what is today western Turkey) and up to the present. It also situates current efforts at RMB internationalisation within the broad sweep of the post-Bretton Woods world order.

His third book is Shanghai, Past and Present. It is an introduction to the warp and weft of the city's history written with non-specialists in mind.

His fourth book is Superpower China ? Historicizing Beijing's New Narratives of Leadership and East Asia's Response Thereto. Horesh is lead author here with Dr Kim and Dr Mauch as co-authors. Superpower China ? features at length analyses of contemporary IR debates in Chinese, Japanese and Korean.

References

External links
Shanghai's Bund and Beyond
Chinese Money in Global Context
Shanghai, Past and Present
 Superpower China ?

Living people
Academic staff of the University of New South Wales
Academic staff of Western Sydney University
Year of birth missing (living people)
Academics of Durham University